David Gakuru (born 1997) is a Rwandan long-distance runner.

In 2017, he competed in the senior men's race at the 2017 IAAF World Cross Country Championships held in Kampala, Uganda. He finished in 62nd place.

In 2018, he competed in the men's half marathon at the 2018 IAAF World Half Marathon Championships held in Valencia, Spain. He finished in 109th place.

References

External links 
 

Living people
1997 births
Place of birth missing (living people)
Rwandan male long-distance runners
Rwandan male cross country runners